Christopher Alvin Stapleton (born April 15, 1978) is an American singer-songwriter, guitarist, and record producer. He was born in Lexington, Kentucky, and grew up in Staffordsville, Kentucky. In 2001, Stapleton moved to Nashville, Tennessee, to pursue an engineering degree from Vanderbilt University but dropped out to pursue his career in music. Subsequently, Stapleton signed a contract with Sea Gayle Music to write and publish his music.

As of 2018, Stapleton has amassed credits writing and co-writing over 170 songs. He has co-written six number-one country songs, including Kenny Chesney's five-week number-one "Never Wanted Nothing More", Josh Turner's "Your Man", George Strait's "Love's Gonna Make It Alright", and Luke Bryan's "Drink a Beer". His songs have appeared on many artists' albums including Adele, Kelly Clarkson, Brad Paisley, Dierks Bentley, and Taylor Swift. He has co-written with several artists as well including Vince Gill, Peter Frampton, Sheryl Crow, and Ed Sheeran.

As a vocalist, Stapleton sang lead in two bands before he started recording as a solo artist including a bluegrass ensemble from 2008 to 2010 called the SteelDrivers and the Jompson Brothers. After that, he released his solo debut: the critically acclaimed studio album titled Traveller (2015), which reached number one on the US Billboard 200 and was certified four-times platinum by the Recording Industry Association of America (RIAA). His version of "Tennessee Whiskey" was certified Diamond by the RIAA. His second studio album From a Room: Volume 1 was released in May 2017, and earned him a second CMA Award for Album of the Year and also a Grammy Award for Best Country Album. From a Room: Volume 2 was released in December 2017. Stapleton released his fourth studio album Starting Over in 2020, for which he won his third Grammy for Best Country Album. The title track was issued as its lead single.

Stapleton has been recognized with several awards including eight Grammy Awards, 10 Academy of Country Music (ACM) Awards, and 14 Country Music Association (CMA) Awards. He was named the ACM's Artist-Songwriter of the Decade. 
In 2023, Rolling Stone ranked Stapleton at number 170 on its list of the 200 Greatest Singers of All Time.

Early life 
Stapleton was born in Lexington, Kentucky. His mother, Carol J. (Mace) Stapleton, worked at the local health department and his father, Herbert Joseph Stapleton, Jr. (1946–2013), was an engineer in the coal mines. He comes from a family of coal miners. He has an older brother, Herbert Joseph III and younger sister, Melanie Brooke.

Stapleton grew up in the small town of Staffordsville, Kentucky, which is located just outside of Paintsville, located between the city and the Paintsville Lake. He graduated from Johnson Central High School where he played football and was his class Valedictorian. He then attended Vanderbilt University, where he studied engineering, but dropped out after a year.

Music career

Career beginnings and bands 
In 2001, Stapleton moved to Nashville, Tennessee, to pursue a music career. As a songwriter, he signed with the publishing house Sea Gayle Music, a deal he got shortly after moving to Nashville.

In 2007, he became the frontman for the bluegrass group the SteelDrivers. They had two hit records; each peaked at number 2 on the bluegrass chart before Stapleton left in 2010.

In 2010, Stapleton founded a Southern rock band called the Jompson Brothers. The band was made up of Stapleton on vocals, Greg McKee on guitar, J.T. Cure on bass, and Bard McNamee on drums. They toured regionally until 2013 and at one point, opened for the Zac Brown Band. The band independently released a self-titled album in November 2010.

In 2013, Stapleton signed to Mercury Nashville, a division of Universal Music Group Nashville, as a solo artist. His first single, "What Are You Listening To?", was released in October 2013, but did not perform as expected. The single was part of a record that was recorded but never released. Stapleton also cowrote the theme—"All-Nighter Comin'"—to the WSM-AM show, The WSM All Nighter with Marcia Campbell, an American radio show with a large trucker following. He cowrote the song with Vince Gill and Al Anderson, with Gill featured on vocals on the track. Songs written by Stapleton have been included on to the soundtracks of several feature films, including Valentine's Day, Alvin and the Chipmunks: The Road Chip, and Hell or High Water.

In 2013, Stapleton and his wife Morgane sang the Waylon Jennings song, "Amanda", live at the Grand Ole Opry. They also did an NPR Tiny Desk Concert in November 2015.

At the 2014 CMT Artist of the Year event, Stapleton performed with Lady A, who played Stapleton's song, "Drink a Beer", which Luke Bryan had recorded, in honor of Bryan, who was unable to attend the ceremony due to a death in his family. Stapleton had previously sung it during Bryan's 2013 CMA Awards performance of the same song.

Solo studio albums

Stapleton's debut solo album, Traveller, was released on May 5, 2015. Recorded in Nashville's RCA Studio A, Stapleton co-produced the album with producer Dave Cobb. On the album he plays guitar and sings with a live band that is made up of bass player J.T. Cure (from the Jompson Brothers), pedal steel player Robby Turner, drummer Derek Mixon, Mickey Raphael on harmonica, and wife Morgane Stapleton singing harmonies. Stapleton emphasized the importance of the band lineup that came together during the making and promotion of the record, saying the familiarity he had with Cure and Mixon (he has known and played with Cure for over 20 years), plus Cobb's producing which included contributing acoustic guitar in the recording process, added to the richness of making the record.

Stapleton said he composed the title track, "Traveller" as he and his wife were driving through New Mexico on their way back to Nashville in a 1979 Jeep that she bought for him after his father died in 2013, which they had flown to Phoenix, Arizona to take possession of. His wife helped him to sift through 15 years worth of songs to pick 9 songs to start recording with.

Stapleton won three awards at the 2015 Country Music Association Awards: Album of the Year, Male Vocalist of the Year, and New Artist of the Year. At the CMA Awards, Stapleton performed with Justin Timberlake his version of the song popularized as a David Allen Coe live-show staple, "Tennessee Whiskey" and Timberlake's "Drink You Away". Considered a career-defining moment by music publications, the performance along with his wins that night lifted him to national prominence. In December 2015, Stapleton received the 2015 CMT Artists of the Year Breakout award during a live performance at the annual CMT Artists of the Year show. Traveller was nominated for the Grammy Award for Album of the Year and won the categories Best Country Album and Best Country Solo Performance. It also won the Academy of Country Music Award for Album of the Year. The top selling country album of 2016, it has sold a total of 2 million copies domestically .

In 2016, Stapleton – along with his wife Morgane – contributed the track, "You Are My Sunshine", to producer Dave Cobb's compilation record project, Southern Family. He collaborated with Jake Owen on the song "If He Ain't Gonna Love You" on Owen's album American Love. Stapleton performed on the main stage at the 2016 Country to Country festival in Europe along with Andrew Combs, Kacey Musgraves and headliner Eric Church. Stapleton was the musical guest on the Saturday Night Live episode which aired January 16, 2016, alongside host Adam Driver. He performed "Parachute" and "Nobody to Blame" from Traveller.

In January 2016, Stapleton performed "Either Way", a song he wrote with Kendall Marvel and Tim James, at the Country Radio Hall of Fame's Country Radio Seminar in Nashville. It was previously recorded by Lee Ann Womack for her 2008 album, Call Me Crazy. The track would be featured on his second studio album From A Room: Volume 1. Released on May 5, 2017, Volume 1 takes its name from Nashville's RCA Studio A, where it was recorded during the winter of 2016–17. The same month he embarked on his All-American Road Show Tour. Volume 1 was certified gold in the US the next month, eventually giving Stapleton his second CMA for Album of the Year, and became the best-selling country album of the year. His third studio album From A Room: Volume 2 was released on December 1, 2017. Both albums Volume 1 and Volume 2 debuted at number two on the Billboard 200 charts.

Stapleton was the musical guest on Saturday Night Live for a second time on January 27, 2018, where he performed songs from From a Room: Volume 2 with Sturgill Simpson. In March, "Broken Halos" off From A Room: Volume 1 reached the top of the Country Airplay chart. It earned him the accolades for Song and Single of the Year at the 52nd CMAs, while he won Male Vocalist of the Year for a fourth time.

On August 28, 2020, Stapleton released a single titled "Starting Over", a song he previously performed on tour. It is the lead single from his album of the same name and marks his first single since 2018's "Millionaire". He then released a second single, "Cold" on September 25, 2020, to further promote the project. He went on to win Male Vocalist of the Year for the fourth time at the 2021 Country Music Association Awards, and Male Artist of the Year for the third time at the 2022 Academy of Country Music Awards. At the latter, he performed "You'll Never Leave Harlan Alive" with Patty Loveless.

Other projects and collaborations

Stapleton co-wrote three songs for Justin Timberlake's studio album Man of the Woods (2018), including their collaboration "Say Something", which reached the top ten list on the US Billboard Hot 100 chart. In the same year, Stapleton also recorded a cover of "I Want Love" for Restoration: Reimagining the Songs of Elton John and Bernie Taupin.

On April 28, 2019, Stapleton appeared as an extra in "The Long Night", the third episode of the eighth season of the HBO series Game of Thrones.

On August 6, 2019, John Mayer invited Stapleton onstage at his concert to perform a song they had both written the day before, titled "I Just Remembered That I Didn't Care" that has yet to receive a studio release. He stayed onstage afterwards for a performance of Mayer's "Slow Dancing in a Burning Room".

Over the course of 2019 and 2020, Stapleton recorded and wrote songs with Mike Campbell, formerly the guitarist of Tom Petty and the Heartbreakers, who is now working with his solo project the Dirty Knobs. In addition to Campbell and fellow Heartbreaker Benmont Tench having played on Stapleton's album Starting Over, Stapleton also featured on the Dirty Knobs' album, Wreckless Abandon.

On August 5, 2021, Stapleton was announced to appear as a featured artist on Taylor Swift's second re-recorded album, Red (Taylor's Version) on the track "I Bet You Think About Me". Stapleton contributed a cover of the Metallica song "Nothing Else Matters" to the charity tribute album The Metallica Blacklist, released in September 2021. He also appears as a credit vocalist on Adele album 30, appearing on an alternate version of "Easy on Me".

Stapleton collaborated with Rage Against the Machine and Audioslave guitarist Tom Morello in both the writing and performance of the track "The War Inside" on Morello's 2021 album, The Atlas Underground Fire.

On February 12, 2023, at Super Bowl LVII, Stapleton sang the National Anthem at State Farm Stadium in Glendale, Arizona, while the lyrics were traduced in American Sign Language by Oscar-winning actor Troy Kotsur. His performance garnered widespread critical acclaim, notably moving Philadelphia Eagles head coach Nick Sirianni to tears, which were televised nationally and became the subject of many internet memes.

Artistry 
Stapleton's musical influences range from outlaw country and bluegrass to rock and roll and blues. Editors from NPR and Paste magazine described his sound as a blend of country, classic rock and Southern soul. Before going solo, Stapleton led the progressive bluegrass band the SteelDrivers and the rock and roll band the Jompson Brothers. His first solo album Traveller is an old-school country, Southern rock and bluegrass record, and his second From A Room: Volume 1 focuses on country, blues and roots rock. He played the acoustic guitar and electric guitar for both albums.

Stapleton is a soul singer  with a tenor vocal range. After attending one of his concerts in 2015, Los Angeles Times writer Randy Lewis opined his singing recalls "the note-bending style of country that traces to Merle Haggard and Lefty Frizzell and the gut-wrenching expressionism of blues and R&B perfected by Ray Charles", while his guitar performances elicits "memories of Texas blues rocker Stevie Ray Vaughan". Stapleton has cited Charles, Otis Redding and Freddie King as some of his music influences, along with Kentucky-based country artists, Keith Whitley, Dwight Yoakam and Patty Loveless: "the list goes on and on. Those names are just part of life in Kentucky. You can't help but be aware of them and be influenced by them."

Personal life 

Stapleton is married to singer-songwriter Morgane Stapleton, who co-wrote Carrie Underwood's 2006 single "Don't Forget to Remember Me". She had a recording deal with Arista Nashville. The couple met when they were working at adjacent publishing houses, married in 2007, and live in Nashville. In October 2017, the couple announced they were expecting twins. On April 15, 2018 (Stapleton's 40th birthday), host Reba McEntire announced live on the 53rd Academy of Country Music Awards that twin boys had been born to the Stapletons. At his concert at Madison Square Garden on November 2, 2018, Stapleton announced that he and his wife were expecting their fifth child; he repeated the announcement at the Country Music Association awards on November 18, 2018. On May 12, 2019, Morgane and Chris welcomed their fifth child, a baby boy, into their family. The Stapletons had a dog named Maggie, for which Chris wrote a song ("Maggie's Song") on his 2020 album Starting Over.

Awards 

Stapleton has received numerous awards and nominations. He is the recipient of eight Grammy Awards, ten Academy of Country Music Awards, fourteen Country Music Association Awards, five Billboard Music Awards, two iHeartRadio Music Awards, among others. For his work as composer he has received nine ASCAP Country awards, including the Vanguard Award. In 2019, Stapleton was recognized by the Academy of Country Music as the inaugural ACM artist-songwriter of the decade. Traveller was Billboards Top Country Album of the decade.

Discography 

Traveller (2015)
From A Room: Volume 1 (2017)
From A Room: Volume 2 (2017)
Starting Over (2020)

Tours and concerts

Main act 

 Hank Williams Jr. and Chris Stapleton Live in Concert (with Hank Williams Jr.) (2016)
 Chris Stapleton's All-American Road Show Tour (2017–2022)
 A Concert for Kentucky, An Outlaw State of Kind Benefit (with Willie Nelson, Sheryl Crow, and Madeline Edwards (singer)) (April 23, 2022) — the first-ever concert at Kroger Field, home to Kentucky Wildcats football

Opening act 
 Outsiders Tour (Eric Church) (2015)
 The Ashes and Dust World Tour (Warren Haynes) (2015)
 Not in This Lifetime... Tour (Guns N' Roses; one date) (2016)
 Tom Petty and the Heartbreakers' 40th Anniversary Tour (Tom Petty and the Heartbreakers; three dates) (2017)
 An Evening With the Eagles (Eagles; two dates) (2018)

See also 
 List of artists who reached number one on the U.S. country chart
 List of country rock musicians
 List of country music performers
 List of southern rock bands

References

External links 

 

 
1978 births
Living people
21st-century American guitarists
21st-century American singers
American baritones
American bluegrass guitarists
American country guitarists
American country rock singers
American country singer-songwriters
American male guitarists
American male singer-songwriters
American Southern Rock musicians
Bluegrass musicians from Kentucky
Country musicians from Kentucky
Grammy Award winners
Guitarists from Kentucky
Mercury Records artists
Outlaw country singers
People from Fayette County, Kentucky
People from Johnson County, Kentucky
People from Paintsville, Kentucky
Record producers from Kentucky
Rock musicians from Kentucky
Singer-songwriters from Kentucky